The Pflerscher Bach is a stream in South Tyrol, Italy. It flows into the Eisack in Gossensaß.

See also
Stubensee

References 
Civic Network of South Tyrol 

Rivers of Italy
Rivers of South Tyrol